The Serious Game (Swedish: Den allvarsamma leken) is a 1945 Swedish period drama film directed by Rune Carlsten and starring Viveca Lindfors, John Ekman and Olof Widgren. It was shot at the Centrumateljéerna Studios in Stockholm. The film's sets were designed by the art director Bertil Duroj. Is is based on the 1912 novel of the same title by Hjalmar Söderberg.

Synopsis
At the turn of the twentieth century, Arvid and Lydia are in love. However, his poor financial circumstances lead her to marry a wealthy, older man instead.

Cast
 Viveca Lindfors as Lydia Stille
 John Ekman as Anders Stille, hennes far
 Olof Widgren as 	Arvid Stjärnblom
 Åke Claesson as 	Roslin
 Eva Dahlbeck as Dagmar Randel
 Gösta Cederlund as 	Redaktör Markel
 Josua Bengtson as 	Grosshandlar Randel
 Hjördis Petterson as 	Hans hustru
 Hugo Björne as Chefredaktör Doncker
 Gunnar Sjöberg as 	Baron Freutiger
 Ulf Palme as Ture Törne
 Renée Björling as Ester Roslin
 Carl Deurell as Arvid's Father 
 Gösta Holmström as 	Captain Linde
 Sven Lindberg as 	Lovén 
 Ruth Weijden as 	Augusta, Stille's Maid
 Birger Malmsten as 	Kaj Lidner
 Per Oscarsson as 	Filip Stille, Lydia's Brother
 Yngve Nyqvist as Randel's Guest
 Sven-Eric Gamble as 	Young Man at the Party
 Inga-Lill Åhström as 	Guest at Doncker's Party

References

Bibliography 
 Goble, Alan. The Complete Index to Literary Sources in Film. Walter de Gruyter, 1999.
 Qvist, Per Olov & von Bagh, Peter. Guide to the Cinema of Sweden and Finland. Greenwood Publishing Group, 2000.

External links 
 

1945 films
1945 drama films
1940s Swedish-language films
Films directed by Rune Carlsten
Films based on Swedish novels
1940s historical drama films
Swedish historical drama films
Films set in the 1900s
1940s Swedish films